Kairos is a South Korean television series starring Shin Sung-rok, Lee Se-young, Ahn Bo-hyun, Nam Gyu-ri, and Kang Seung-yoon. Directed by Park Seung-woo, the main themes of the series are opportunity and choice. It premiered on MBC TV on October 26 to December 22, 2020 and aired every Monday and Tuesday at 21:20 (KST).

The series is the last Monday-Tuesday drama project (월화 드라마 ) of MBC.

Synopsis 
Kim Seo-jin (Shin Sung-rok) is a successful and workaholic construction company director. One day, his daughter goes missing with no trace. Shortly after, his wife, Kang Hyun-chae (Nam Gyu-ri), commits suicide due to the shock.

Han Ae-ri (Lee Se-young) is a hard-working daughter whose mother goes missing in a hospital. She then receives a phone call from Seo-jin. He lives one month ahead of Ae-ri. He asks her to prevent the horrific events that destroyed his family and in return, she wants him to find her mother.

Cast

Main 
 Shin Sung-rok as Kim Seo-jin
 Lee Jung-joon as young Kim Seo-jin
 Lee Se-young as Han Ae-ri
 Ahn Bo-hyun as Seo Do-gyun
 Nam Gyu-ri as Kang Hyun-chae, Seo-jin's wife and Kim Da-bin's mother
 Kang Seung-yoon as Im Geon-wook

Supporting

People associated with Seo-jin 
 Shim Hye-yeon as Kim Da-bin, Kim Seo-jin and Kang Hyun-chae's daughter
 So Hee-jung as Jung Hye-kyeong, Da-bin's babysitter

People associated with Ae-ri 
 Hwang Jung-min as Kwak Song-ja, Ae-ri's mother
 Lee Joo-myung as Park Soo-jung, Ae-ri's best friend

Yujung Construction 
 Shin Goo as Yoo Seo-il, Chairman of Yujung Construction
 Cho Dong-in as Lee Taek-gyu, Kim Seo-jin's personal assistant

Detectives 
 Lim Chul-hyung as Park Ho-young
 Jeon Kwang-jin as Choi Deok-ho
 Jung Sung-joon as Lee Tae-woo
 Lee Tae-gu as Kang Byeong-suk

Others 
 Choi Duk-moon as Kim Yoo-seok
 Kwon Hyuk as Han Tae-gil
 Ko Kyu-pil as Kim Jin-ho

Special appearances 
 Lee Si-eon as delivery man, suspect in Da-bin's kidnapping case (Ep. 1–2)
 Sung Ji-ru
 Jung Hee-tae

Original soundtrack

Part 1

Part 2

Part 3

Part 4

Part 5

Part 6

Part 7

Part 8

Part 9

Part 10

Part 11

Part 12

Part 13

Part 14

Part 15

Part 16

Ratings

Awards and nominations

References

External links
  
 
 

MBC TV television dramas
Korean-language television shows
2020 South Korean television series debuts
2020 South Korean television series endings
South Korean time travel television series
South Korean fantasy television series
South Korean thriller television series
Television series by Blossom Entertainment